David Hawkes may refer to:

David Hawkes (VC) (1822–1858), English recipient of the Victoria Cross
David Hawkes (sinologist) (1923–2009), British sinologist
David Hawkes (professor of English) (born 1964), professor of English at Arizona State University

See also
David Hawk (disambiguation)